Haviland is a community and census-designated place (CDP) in Dutchess County, New York, United States. The population was 3,634 at the 2010 census. It is part of the Poughkeepsie–Newburgh–Middletown, NY Metropolitan Statistical Area as well as the larger New York–Newark–Bridgeport, NY-NJ-CT-PA Combined Statistical Area.

Haviland is in the southern portion of the town of Hyde Park. The Eleanor Roosevelt National Historic Site is located within the community.

Geography
Haviland is located in west-central Dutchess County at  (41.7668, -73.9015). New York State Route 9G (Violet Avenue) is the main road through the community, leading south  to Poughkeepsie. The western border of the hamlet is defined by the Maritje Kill.

Demographics

As of the census of 2000, there were 3,710 people, 1,417 households, and 1,031 families residing in the CDP. The population density was 958.5 per square mile (370.1/km2). There were 1,446 housing units at an average density of 373.6/sq mi (144.3/km2). The racial makeup of the CDP was 93.23% White, 2.91% African American, 0.08% Native American, 1.75% Asian, 0.57% from other races, and 1.46% from two or more races. Hispanic or Latino of any race were 2.24% of the population.

There were 1,417 households, out of which 33.3% had children under the age of 18 living with them, 58.4% were married couples living together, 11.4% had a female householder with no husband present, and 27.2% were non-families. 21.6% of all households were made up of individuals, and 9.2% had someone living alone who was 65 years of age or older. The average household size was 2.61 and the average family size was 3.03.

In the CDP, the population was spread out, with 25.8% under the age of 18, 7.0% from 18 to 24, 27.8% from 25 to 44, 25.0% from 45 to 64, and 14.3% who were 65 years of age or older. The median age was 39 years. For every 100 females, there were 90.0 males. For every 100 females age 18 and over, there were 92.0 males.

The median income for a household in the CDP was $47,772, and the median income for a family was $54,861. Males had a median income of $48,021 versus $28,793 for females. The per capita income for the CDP was $21,174. About 7.5% of families and 7.4% of the population were below the poverty line, including 8.2% of those under age 18 and 6.1% of those age 65 or over.

References

External links
 Haviland, New York is at coordinates .

Hyde Park, New York
Census-designated places in New York (state)
Poughkeepsie–Newburgh–Middletown metropolitan area
Census-designated places in Dutchess County, New York
Hamlets in New York (state)